Abihka was one of the four mother towns of the Muscogee Creek confederacy. Abihka is also sometimes used to refer to all Upper Creek (or Muscogee) people.

History

Origins
The Abihka were the remnants of the 16th century "Chiefdom of Coosa." The bulk of the Natchez people settled with the Abihka after being dispersed by the French in the 18th century.

Etymology
The name "Abihka" (meaning unknown), is sometimes used to refer to all the Upper Creek peoples.

Territory
The members of the Abihka were Upper Creek Indians. Their main place of residence was along the banks of the Coosa and Alabama rivers, in what is now Talladega County, Alabama. Besides the town of Abihka, the Creek had established other important towns in their territory: Abihkutchi, Tuckabutche, Talladega, Coweta, and Kan-tcati.

Ceremonial grounds
After the removal to the Indian Territory, refugees from the Abihka mother-town established a ceremonial stomp dance ground which they call Abihka (or sometimes, Arbeka). It is located near Henryetta, Oklahoma.

Alice Brown Davis and her husband, George Rollin Davis, operated a trading post, post office, general store and the Bar X Bar ranch in Arbeka until George's death. She succeeded him as postmistress in the 1890s. There is an Arbeka Road in the area.

Notes

References
Nabokov, Peter and Robert Easton; Native American Architecture.; New York; The Oxford University Press; 1989; .
 Swanton, John R.; The Indians of the Southeastern United States; United States Government Printing Office; Washington, DC; 1946; p. 81-82.
 Waselkov, Gregory A.; and Smith, Marvin T.; Upper Creek Archaeology; referenced in McEwan, Bonnie G.; edition Indians of the Greater Southeast: Historical Archaeology and Ethnohistory; Gainesville; University of Florida Press; 2000; p. 244.

Muscogee tribal towns
South Appalachian Mississippian culture
Native American tribes in Alabama
Okmulgee County, Oklahoma
Pre-statehood history of Oklahoma